Carr is a common surname in northern England, deriving from the Old Norse , meaning a brushwood, thicket or copse. It may also come from the ancient Norse Kjarr translation meaning Kaiser from Caesar  Kerr is a Scottish variant, often from the Norse and (particularly on the west coast and Arran) from the Gaelic , meaning "dusky". Carr is also a common surname in Ireland, where it often derives from the nickname, meaning "short of height". In some cases it is thought to come from the Welsh word , meaning giant. Alternatively, in Ireland and Scotland, it may derive from the Irish and Scottish Gaelic  meaning pointed spear.

Notable people with the surname "Carr"

A
Aaron Albert Carr (born 1963), Native American filmmaker
Adriane Carr (born 1952), Canadian politician
Alan Carr (disambiguation), multiple people
Alby Carr (1899–1969), Australian rugby league footballer
Alexander Carr (1878–1946), Russian actor
Alfred C. Carr Jr. (born 1965), American politician
Alice Comyns Carr (1850–1927), British costume designer
Alister Carr (born 1973), Australian rules footballer
Allan Carr (1937–1999), American film producer
Allen Carr (1934–2006), British author
Amanda Carr (disambiguation), multiple people
Amara Carr (born 1994), English cricketer
Andrew Carr (disambiguation), multiple people
Andy Carr (born 1956), English footballer
Ann Carr (gymnast), American gymnast
Ann Carr (evangelist) (1783–1941), British evangelist
Annaleise Carr (born 1998), Canadian swimmer
Anne Carr (1934–2008), American theologian
Anthony Carr (disambiguation), multiple people
Antoine Carr (born 1961), American basketball player
Antony Carr (1916–1995), English author
Aquille Carr (born 1993), American basketball player
Archie Carr (1909–1987), American biologist
Arthur Carr (disambiguation), multiple people
Austin Carr (disambiguation), multiple people

B
Barbara Carr (born 1941), American singer
Barney Carr (1897–1971), Australian rules footballer
Benita Carr, American photographer
Benjamin Carr (1768–1831), American composer
Bernard Carr (born 1949), British mathematics professor
Bert Carr (1870–1930), American football player
Betsy B. Carr (born 1946), American politician
Betty Ann Carr (1942–1995), American actress
Bill Carr (disambiguation), multiple people
Billy Carr (1905–1989), English footballer
Bob Carr (disambiguation), multiple people
Borfor Carr (born 1987), Liberian footballer
Brandon Carr (born 1986), American football player
Brendan Carr (disambiguation), multiple people
Brian Carr (born 1969), Scottish boxer
Brian Allen Carr (born 1979), American writer
Bruce W. Carr (1924–1998), American pilot
Bunny Carr (1927–2018), Irish television presenter

C
Caleb Carr (disambiguation), multiple people
Calen Carr (born 1982), American soccer player
Cameron Carr (disambiguation), multiple people
Carol Carr (born 1939), American social figure
Catherine Carr (disambiguation), multiple people
Cathy Carr (singer) (1936–1988), American pop singer
Cathy Carr (swimmer) (born 1954), American swimmer
Cecil Carr (1878–1966), English lawyer
Cedric Carr (1892–1936), New Zealand botanist
Charles Carr (disambiguation), multiple people
Charmian Carr (1942–2016), American actress
Chaz Carr (born 1982), Jamaican basketball player
Chris Carr (disambiguation), multiple people
Chuck Carr (disambiguation), multiple people
Cindy Carr, American set decorator
CJ Carr (born 1995), American basketball player
Clay Carr (1909–1957), American cowboy
Clem Carr (1901–1984), Australian rules footballer
Cletis Carr (born 1959), American singer-songwriter
Cliff Carr (born 1964), English footballer
Clive Carr, English hotelier
Clyde Carr (1886–1962), New Zealand politician
Colette Carr (born 1991), American musician
Colin Carr (born 1957), British cellist
Cornelius Carr (born 1969), British boxer
Cory Carr (born 1975), American-Israeli basketball player
Cynthia Carr (born 1950), American writer
Cyril Carr (1926–1981), British politician

D
Dabney Carr (1773–1837), American lawyer
Dabney Carr (Virginia assemblyman) (1743–1773), American politician
Dale Carr (American football) (born 1964), American football coach
Dale Carr (politician) (born 1954), American politician
Daniel Carr (disambiguation), multiple people
Darleen Carr (born 1950), American actress
Dave Carr (disambiguation), multiple people
David Carr (disambiguation), multiple people
Declan Carr (born 1965), Irish hurler
Derek Carr (born 1991), American football player
Derek Carr (footballer) (1927–2004), English footballer
Deveron Carr (born 1990), American football player
Diane Carr (born 1946), American artist
Donald Carr (1926–2016), English cricketer
Donald Eaton Carr (1903–1986), American journalist
Dora Carr, American musician
Douglas Carr (1872–1950), English cricketer

E
Earl Carr (born 1955), American football player
Eddie Carr (1917–1998), English footballer
Edith Carr (1856–1919), American-Canadian painter
Edith Carr (artist) (1875–1949), British painter
Edwin Carr (disambiguation), multiple people
E. H. Carr (1892–1982), English historian
Elan Carr (born 1968), American attorney
Eleanor Kearny Carr (1840–1912), American political hostess
Eli Carr (born 2001), Puerto Rican footballer
Elias Carr (1839–1900), American politician
Elizabeth Jordan Carr (born 1981), American social figure
Emily Carr (1871–1945), Canadian artist and writer
Emma P. Carr (1880–1972), American chemist
Emsley Carr (1867–1941), British editor
Eric Carr (1950–1991), American musician
Eric Carr (boxer) (born 1975), American boxer
Erin Lee Carr (born 1988), American filmmaker
Ernest Carr (1875–1956), Australian politician
Ernie Carr (1890–1965), Australian rugby union footballer
Eugene Asa Carr (1830–1910), American general
Everton Carr (born 1961), Antiguan footballer
Ezra S. Carr (1819–1894), American professor

F
Fern G. Z. Carr (born 1956), Canadian poet
Fionn Carr (born 1985), Irish rugby union footballer
Fionnuala Carr, Irish camogie player
Francis Carr (disambiguation), multiple people
Frank Carr (disambiguation), multiple people
Franz Carr (born 1966), English footballer
Fred Carr (1946–2018), American football player
Frederick Carr (born 1947), American meteorologist

G
Gareth Carr (born 1981), South African field hockey player
Gary Carr (disambiguation), multiple people
Gavin Carr, British conductor
Gene Carr (disambiguation), multiple people
Geneva Carr (born 1971), American actress
Geoff Carr (born 1952), Australian rugby league footballer and administrator
Geoffrey Carr (1886–1939), British rower
Georgia Carr (1925–1971), American singer
Gerald Carr (disambiguation), multiple people
Geraldine Carr (1914–1954), American actress
Gerry Carr (disambiguation), multiple people
Gillian Carr, British archaeologist
Graeme Carr (born 1978), English footballer
Graham Carr (born 1944), English footballer
Gregg Carr (born 1962), American football player
Gregory Carr (disambiguation), multiple people
G. S. Carr (1837–1914), British mathematician
Gwen Carr (born 1949), American activist

H
Hank Earl Carr (1968–1998), American criminal
Harlan Carr (1903–1970), American football player
Harold Herbert Carr (1880–1973), New Zealand judge
Harold Norman Carr (1887–1974), Canadian politician
Harriet Carr (1771–1848), British artist
Harry Carr (1877–1936), American reporter
Harry Carr (footballer) (1887–1942), English footballer
Harvey A. Carr (1873–1954), American psychologist
Helen Carr, English journalist
Helena Carr (born 1946), Australian businesswoman
Henry Carr (disambiguation), multiple people
Herbert Wildon Carr (1857–1931), British philosopher
Herman Carr (1924–2008), American physicist
Homer M. Carr (1887–1964), American politician
Howard Ellis Carr (1880–1960), British theatre conductor and composer
Howie Carr (born 1952), American broadcaster
 "Kid" Howard Carr, lyricist of "We Don't Want the Bacon" (1918)
Hugh Carr, Irish politician

I
Ian Carr (1933–2009), Scottish musician
Ian Carr (guitarist) (born 1965), English guitarist
Iain Carr (born 1977), English cricketer
Irving J. Carr (1875–1963), American general

J
Jack Carr (disambiguation), multiple people
Jacky Carr (1892–1942), English footballer
James Carr (disambiguation), multiple people
Jamie Carr (born 1982), Irish Gaelic footballer
Jane Carr (disambiguation), multiple people
Janet Carr (1933–2014), Australian physiotherapist
Janet Carr (psychologist) (1927–2020), British psychologist
Jayge Carr (1940–2006), American author
J. Comyns Carr (1849–1916), English art critic
Jeff Carr (disambiguation), multiple people
Jeffrey Carr, American author
Jekalyn Carr (born 1997), American recording artist
Jered Carr, American political scientist
Jim Carr (disambiguation), multiple people
Jimmy Carr (born 1972), English-Irish comedian
Jimmy Carr (bookmaker) (1864–1942), in South Australia
J. L. Carr (1912–1994), English novelist
Job Carr (1813–1887), American soldier
Jody Carr (born 1975), Canadian politician
Joe Carr (1922–2004), Irish golfer
John Carr (disambiguation), multiple people
Johnnie Carr (1911–2008), American activist
Johnny Carr (1887–??), American baseball player
Jonathan Carr (disambiguation), multiple people
Joseph Carr (disambiguation), multiple people
Josh Carr (born 1980), Australian rules footballer
J. Revell Carr (born 1939), American author
Judith Carr (disambiguation), multiple people
Julian Carr (disambiguation), multiple people
Julie Palakovich Carr (born 1983), American politician

K
Karen Carr (born 1960), American illustrator
Karen L. Carr, American philosopher
Katie Roe Carr, British television personality
Katy Carr (born 1980), British singer-songwriter
Kelly Carr (born 1980/1981), American journalist
Kenneth Monroe Carr (1925–2015), American admiral
Kenny Carr (born 1955), American basketball player
Kevin Carr (born 1958), English footballer
Kim Carr (born 1955), Australian politician
Kris Carr (born 1971), American author
Kurt Carr (born 1964), American composer
Kyle Carr (born 1986), American speed skater
Kyle Carr (soccer) (born 1995), American soccer player

L
Lance Carr (1910–1983), South African footballer
Laurence Carr (1886–1954), British general
Laurie Carr (born 1965), American model and actress
Leeming Carr (1864–1934), Canadian physician
Leland W. Carr (1883–1969), American jurist
Leon Carr (1910–1976), American songwriter
Leonard G. Carr (1902–1976), American minister
Leroy Carr (1905–1935), American singer-songwriter
Les Carr (1929–2012), Australian rules footballer
Levert Carr (born 1944), American football player
Linda Carr, American singer
Liz Carr (born 1972), English actress
Lloyd Carr (born 1945), American football coach
Lori Carr, Canadian politician
Lorne Carr (1910–2007), Canadian ice hockey player
Louis Carr (born 1960), English speedway racer
Lowell Juilliard Carr (1885–1963), American sociologist
Lucien Carr (1925–2005), American editor
Lucy Carr (born 1976), British singer

M
Maisie Carr (1912–1988), Australian ecologist
Marcus Carr (born 1999), Canadian basketball player
Margaret Carr (born 1941), New Zealand academic
Margaret Carr (novelist) (born 1935), British novelist
Marian Carr (1926–2003), American actress
Marilyn Gillies Carr (born 1941), Scottish social figure
Marina Carr (born 1964), Irish playwright
Marjorie Harris Carr (1915–1997), American environmental activist
Markus Carr (born 1979), American basketball player
Martin Carr (born 1968), British musician
Martin A. Carr, Irish architect
Mary Carr (1874–1973), American actress
Mary Jane Carr (1895–1988), American author
Matthew Carr (born 1978), Australian rules footballer
Max Carr (1922–2016), New Zealand athlete
Maxine Carr (criminal) (born 1977), English criminal
Michael Carr (disambiguation), multiple people
Milton Robert Carr (born 1943), American politician
M. L. Carr (born 1951), American basketball player

N
Nat Carr (1886–1944), American actor
Nate Carr (born 1960), American wrestler
Nathan T. Carr (1833–1885), American politician
Nevin Carr (born 1956), American admiral
Nicholas Carr (disambiguation), multiple people
Nigel Carr (born 1959), Irish rugby union footballer
Nigel Carr (American football) (born 1990), American football player
Nizaam Carr (born 1991), South African rugby union footballer
Norm Carr (born 1955), Australian rugby league footballer
Norman Carr (1912–1997), British conservationist

O
Oba Carr (born 1972), American boxer
Oscar Clark Carr Jr. (??–1977), American activist
Otis T. Carr (1904–1982) American inventor

P
Patrick Carr (disambiguation), multiple people
Paul Carr (disambiguation), multiple people
Peggy Carr (born 1955), Saint Vincentian journalist
Percifer Carr (??–1804), British loyalist
Pete Carr (1950–2020), American guitarist
Peter Carr (disambiguation), multiple people

R
Ralph Lawrence Carr (1887–1950), American politician
Randy Carr (1956–2002), American musician
Ray Carr (born 1948), Australian rules footballer
Raymond Carr (1919–2015), English historian
Red Carr (1916–1990), Canadian ice hockey player
Reginald Carr (disambiguation), multiple people
Richard Carr (disambiguation), multiple people
Robert Carr (disambiguation), multiple people
Robyn Carr (born 1951), American author
Roderick Carr (1891–1971), New Zealand air marshal
Rod Carr (administrator) (born 1958/1959), New Zealand businessman and university administrator
Rod Carr (boxer) (born 1968), Australian boxer
Roger Carr (born 1952), American football player
Roger Carr (businessman) (born 1946), British businessman
Ronald Carr (born 1938), South African cricketer
Rosamond Carr (1912–2006), American humanitarian
Rosetta Ernestine Carr (1845–1907), Canadian photographer
Ross Carr, English Gaelic footballer
Roy Carr (1945–2018), English journalist
Russell Carr, British car designer
Ruth Carr (born 1953), Northern Irish writer

S
Sabin Carr (1904–1983), American pole vaulter
Sally Carr (born 1945), Scottish singer
Sam Carr (1906–1989), Canadian politician
Sam Carr (musician) (1926–2009), American drummer
Samuel Carr (disambiguation), multiple people
Sandra Carr (born 1971), Australian politician
Sean D. Carr (born 1969), American entrepreneur
Seth Carr (born 2007), American actor
Shane Carr, Irish Gaelic footballer
Shirley Carr (1929–2010), Canadian union leader
Simon Carr (tennis) (born 1999), Irish tennis player
Simon Carr (cyclist) (born 1998), British cyclist
Slip Carr (1899–1971), Australian rugby union footballer
Solomon C. Carr (1830–1914), American politician and farmer
Stacey Carr (born 1984), New Zealand field hockey player
Stephen Carr (born 1976), Irish footballer
Stephen Carr (figure skater) (born 1966), Australian ice skater
Steve Carr (born 1965), American film director
Steve Carr (artist) (born 1976), New Zealand artist
Steven E. Carr (born 1957), American attorney
Susannah Carr (born 1952), Australian television presenter

T
Terry Carr (1937–1987), American author
Thomas Carr (disambiguation), multiple people
Tony Carr (born 1950), British sports executive
Tony Carr (footballer, born 1901) (1901–1968), English footballer
T. R. Carr, American politician
Trem Carr (1891–1946), American film producer

V
Valerie Carr (born 1936), American singer
Vikki Carr (born 1940), American singer
Virginia Spencer Carr (1929–2012), American biographer

W
Wally Carr (1954–2019), Australian boxer
Walter Carr (disambiguation), multiple people
Warren Carr (1929–1993), Australian singer
Wayne Carr (1897–1954), American baseball player
W. B. Carr (1861–1943), Australian journalist
Wes Carr (born 1982), Australian singer-songwriter
Wesley Carr (1941–2017), English priest
Wilbur J. Carr (1870–1942), American diplomat
William Carr (disambiguation), multiple people
Willie Carr (born 1950), Scottish footballer
Wooda Nicholas Carr (1871–1953), American politician
Wynona Carr (1923–1976), American singer-songwriter

Z
Zacharious Carr, English footballer

Fictional characters
Carissa Carr, a character in the comic series Marvel Transformers
Snapper Carr, a character in the comic series DC Universe

See also

Attorney General Carr (disambiguation), a disambiguation page for Attorney Generals surnamed "Carr"
General Carr (disambiguation), a disambiguation page for Generals surnamed "Carr"
Justice Carr (disambiguation), a disambiguation page for Justices surnamed "Carr"
Lord Carr (disambiguation), a disambiguation page for Lords surnamed "Carr"
Senator Carr (disambiguation), a disambiguation page for Senators surnamed "Carr"
Car (surname)
Karr (surname)
Carry (name), a page for people with the given name "Carry"
Curr (surname), a page for people with the surname "Curr"
Kerr (disambiguation), a disambiguation page for "Kerr"

References

English-language surnames